Special sciences are those sciences other than fundamental physics. In this view, chemistry, biology, and neuroscience—indeed, all sciences except fundamental physics—are special sciences.  The status of the special sciences, and their relation to physics, is unresolved in the philosophy of science. Jerry Fodor, for instance, has argued for strong autonomy, concluding that the special sciences are not even in principle reducible to physics.
As such Fodor has often been credited for having helped turn the tide against reductionist physicalism.

See also
Emergence
Emergentism
Multiple realizability
Physics
Reductionism
Supervenience
The central science
Unity of science

References

Philosophy of science
Reductionism
Emergence